The 1892 Philadelphia Phillies season was a season in American baseball. The team competed in the National League, which played a split season this year. The Phillies finished in third place in the first half of the season, and in fifth place in the second half. Their overall record was 87–66, fourth-best in the National League.

Offseason

Spring training
The Phillies held spring training in 1892 in Gainesville, Florida, the team's first spring in Florida. Twelve members of the team rode the train 40-hours from Philadelphia's Broad Street Station to Gainesville. The team practiced and played exhibition games at The Ballpark. The Phillies would lose $469.69 on the trip. The team would return to Gainesville for spring training in 1921.

Regular season

Season standings

Record vs. opponents

Roster

Player stats

Batting

Starters by position
Note: Pos = Position; G = Games played; AB = At bats; H = Hits; Avg. = Batting average; HR = Home runs; RBI = Runs batted in

Other batters 
Note: G = Games played; AB = At bats; H = Hits; Avg. = Batting average; HR = Home runs; RBI = Runs batted in

Pitching

Starting pitchers 
Note: G = Games pitched; IP = Innings pitched; W = Wins; L = Losses; ERA = Earned run average; SO = Strikeouts

Other pitchers 
Note: G = Games pitched; IP = Innings pitched; W = Wins; L = Losses; ERA = Earned run average; SO = Strikeouts

References

External links
1892 Philadelphia Phillies season at Baseball Reference

Philadelphia Phillies seasons
Philadelphia Phillies season
Philly